Siena Nicole Agudong (born August 19, 2004) is an American actress. She is known for her roles in the Nickelodeon series Star Falls (2018), the film Alex & Me (2018), the Netflix series No Good Nick (2019), the Disney Channel Original Movie Upside-Down Magic (2020), and the Netflix adaptation of Resident Evil (2022).

Early life and education
Siena was born in Kauai, Hawaii to parents Karen and Kenneth Agudong. She is of Hawaiian, Filipino, and European descent. She has an older sister, Sydney, who inspired her to act.

Siena attended King Kaumuali‘i Elementary School and Island School. She then switched to online school for her acting career.

Career
Agudong started acting when she was 7 in local productions, her first role being in Willy Wonka at the Hawaii Children’s Theatre. She made her television debut at the age of 8 with a recurring role as Lulu Parker in Killer Women. She played the recurring role of Natlee on Nicky, Ricky, Dicky & Dawn and has had guest roles in Teachers and Sydney to the Max.

Agudong's work earned her several Young Artist Award and Young Entertainer Award nominations since 2015 and a win for Best Guest Starring Young Actress – 12 & Under in 2017.

Agudong starred in 2018 Warner Bros. direct-to-video film Alex & Me as Reagan Wills. In 2018, Agudong also was cast as the lead, Sophia Miller, in the Nickelodeon series Star Falls. In September 2018, it was announced she would play the titular role of a young con-artist in 2019 Netflix sitcom, No Good Nick, her first lead role. In August 2019 it was announced that Agudong had been cast in the co-starring role of Reina Carvajal in the Disney Channel Original Movie, Upside-Down Magic, which premiered on July 31, 2020. The latter film was officially Agudong's first lead role in a film. Siena later portrayed a younger Mia Toretto in F9.

Filmography

Film

Television

Awards and nominations

References

External links
 

2004 births
Living people
21st-century American actresses
Actresses from Hawaii
American actresses of Filipino descent
American people of Native Hawaiian descent
American child actresses
People from Kauai